Meira Chand (born 1942) is a novelist of Swiss-Indian parentage and was born and educated in London.

Life 

She was born and grew up in South London.  Her mother, Norah Knoble was of Swiss origin, and her Indian father, Habans Lal Gulati came to London in 1919 to study medicine.  He was Britain's first Indian GP, a pioneer of early NHS services and the Socialist Medical Association, and first Indian Labour member of the London County Council for South Battersea, standing as a parliamentary candidate. She attended Putney High School and later studied art at St Martin's School of Art & Design and Hammersmith Art School.

In 1962 she married Kumar Chand, and went with him to live in the Kobe/Osaka region of Japan.  In 1971 she relocated with her husband and two children to Mumbai in India, but returned to Japan in 1976.  She remained in Japan until 1997 when she moved to Singapore, where she now permanently lives, becoming a Singapore citizen in 2011. She has an MA in creative writing from Edith Cowan University, Perth, Australia, and a PhD in creative writing from the University of Western Australia.

Writing 

Five of her eight novels are set in Japan, The Gossamer Fly, Last Quadrant, The Bonsai Tree, The Painted Cage and A Choice of Evils, a novel of the Pacific war, that explores the Japanese occupation of China, and questions of war guilt and responsibility. Contemporary India is the location of House of the Sun that, in 1990, was adapted for the stage in London where it had a successful run at Theatre Royal Stratford East.  It was the first Asian play with an all-Asian cast and direction to be performed in London.  The play was voted Critic's Choice by Time Out magazine.  Also set in India, but in Calcutta during the early days of the Raj, A Far Horizon considers the notorious story of the Black Hole of Calcutta.  Written after her move to Singapore, A Different Sky takes place against the backdrop of colonial times before independence in the country. Based on meticulous historical research, the novel follows the lives of three families in the 30 years leading up to Singapore's independence. The book fictionally examines an era that includes the Second World War and the subsequent Japanese occupation of Singapore, and also the rise of post-war nationalism in Malaya. On its publication in 2010 it was chosen as a Book of the Month by the UK bookshop chain Waterstones. The novel was also on Oprah Winfrey's recommended reading list for November 2011, and long listed for the Impac Dublin literary award 2012.

She wrote the story from which The LKY Musical, the 2015 smash hit Singaporean theatre production was developed with a team of international artists.  A tale of high drama, intrigue, betrayal, love and loyalty, the musical centres on the early life of Lee Kuan Yew, his struggles and enduring relationship with his wife.  It offers insights into the emotional conflict faced by Singapore's founder and his friends at a time when the island's history balanced on a knife-edge.

In Singapore she is involved in many programmes to nurture young writers and to develop literature and promote the joy of reading.

Select Bibliography
The Gossamer Fly (1979, John Murray, UK / Ticknor and Fields, USA) 
Last Quadrant (1981, John Murray, UK / Ticknor and Fields, USA) 
The Bonsai Tree (1983, John Murray, UK, Ticknor and Fields, USA) 
The Painted Cage (1986, Century Hutchinson, UK) 
House of the Sun (1989, Hutchinson, UK) 
A Choice of Evils (1996 Weidenfeld & Nicolson, UK) 
A Far Horizon (2001, Weidenfeld & Nicolson, UK) 
A Different Sky (2010, Harvill Secker/Random House, UK) 
Sacred Waters (2018, Marshall Cavendish, Singapore)

References

 About Meira. meirachand.com. Meira Chand. Retrieved 18 August 2009.
 National Library Distinguished Readers. National Library Board Singapore. Retrieved 18 August 2009.
 House of the Sun Tour Schedule. Tamasha. Retrieved 21 March 2015.

External links
 Meira Chand's website

1942 births
Living people
20th-century British novelists
21st-century British novelists
British expatriates in Singapore
English people of Indian descent
English people of Swiss descent